The Franz Beckenbauer Cup is an annual friendly association football match named in honour of Franz Beckenbauer. It is organised by Bayern Munich before the beginning of the season, and played between the hosts and a guest team at the Allianz Arena.

Inspiration for the cup came from Bayern's participation in the 2006 Joan Gamper Trophy.

Bayern Munich has never won the cup.

Matches
In case of a draw, the winner is immediately decided on penalties. No extra time is played.

References

2007 establishments in Germany
FC Bayern Munich
German football friendly trophies
Recurring sporting events established in 2007